The Piray River is a river of Bolivia. Santa Cruz de la Sierra, Bolivia's largest city by population, is located on this river.

See also
List of rivers of Bolivia

References
Rand McNally, The New International Atlas, 1993.
National Geographic, Atlas of the World—9th Edition, 2010.

Rivers of Santa Cruz Department (Bolivia)